Mohd Nazrin bin Mohd Nawi (born 7 February 1988 in Tumpat, Kelantan) is a Malaysian footballer who last played for Kelantan in 2020 Malaysia Super League seasons. Nazrin plays mainly as a winger but can also play as an attacking midfielder.

Club career

Negeri Sembilan
Besides team poor performance in the league, Nazrin played very well and become fan favourite. His speed and direct running always gave a constant threat to opponent defender. Nazrin scored a hat-trick during 2013 Malaysia Cup playoff playing against Sabah at the Shah Alam Stadium.

Johor Darul Ta'zim
After his contract with Negeri Sembilan ended in November 2013, Nazrin signed with southern of Malaysia club Johor Darul Ta'zim. Rumors say Johor Darul Ta'zim has been offering about RM40,000 a month to get him into the club.

Perak
In December 2016, Nazrin completed his transfer to Perak for a fee reported to be around RM 1.5 million along with his teammate Jasazrin Jamaluddin. Nazrin made his league debut for Perak in 0–1 win over Penang on 27 January 2017.

Career statistics

Club

International

Honour

Club
Johor Darul Ta'zim
 Malaysian Charity Shield: 2015, 2016
 Malaysian Super League: 2014, 2015, 2016
 Malaysia Cup: Runner-up 2014
 Malaysia FA Cup: 2016
 AFC Cup: 2015

Perak TBG
 Malaysian Super League: Runners-up 2018
 Malaysia Cup: 2018

References

External links
 
 

1988 births
Living people
Malaysian footballers
Malaysia international footballers
Negeri Sembilan FA players
UPB-MyTeam FC players
Kuala Lumpur City F.C. players
Johor Darul Ta'zim F.C. players
People from Kelantan
Malaysia Super League players
Association football wingers
Malaysian people of Malay descent